Tickle, Patch and Friends was a BAFTA award-winning television series for children. The series was produced in-house by Ed Matthews for the United Kingdom television network Channel 5, and was originally broadcast in the Milkshake! programming block, which ran from 28 August 1999 to 26 June 2005.

Plot
Tickle, Patch and Friends featured the misadventures of the two guinea pigs Tickle and Patch. Made and Puppeteered by Marcus Clarke and Helena Smee. Each episode would see the pair taking on a job to make money. The show featured crossover appearances from Channel 5's other children's programming. Shows included PB Bear, Plonsters, Animal Antics, and Mr. Men and Little Miss. These other shows also aired on Milkshake! The show broadcasts at a variety of locations, such as zoos, seasides, central London, churches, schools and farms.

Other characters
 Pipsqueak: a baby guinea who was introduced to Tickle and Patch in late 2002.
 37 Bear: a Taxi Driving Bear.
 Thing: a large insect of unknown origin.
 Alien: a fleece Alien Puppet.

Features
 The Picture Gallery (later changed to The Farmyard Gallery in the later series) - Tickle and Patch look at viewers' drawings.
 Patch FM - Tickle and Patch are being disc jockeys and they talk to viewers on their video phone and answer frequently asked questions from them.
 Joke Time - Tickle and Patch read out viewers' jokes on location (e.g. outside a theme park) and they usually laugh at them so much, their socks or pants blow off for extra laughs.
 Tickle's Quiz - Featured in the later series where Tickle stays in the barn from the rain and asks the audience a simple question involving what sound does a farm animal or vehicle make.

Programmes featured as part of Tickle, Patch and Friends
Mr Men and Little Miss
Plonsters
PB Bear and Friends
Animal Antics
When I Grow Up
Little Antics
Animal Express
Monkey Makes
Why
Insect Antics
Klootz
Mio Mao
Sailor Sid
Softies
Aussie Antics
Bird Bath
Funky Valley
Funky Town

In other media
 During the early 2000s, Tickle and Patch were sometimes accompanied with the Milkshake! presenters in additional spin-off programmes and features in continuity links
 Outtakes from the show were included on various episodes of It'll Be Alright on the Night.
 In 2020, Patch auditioned for Britain's Got Talent as a comedian but got buzzed off after 1 joke and received 4 nos.

External links

References 

1999 British television series debuts
2005 British television series endings
1990s British children's television series
2000s British children's television series
1990s British animated television series
2000s British animated television series
British children's animated adventure television series
British television shows based on children's books
Channel 5 (British TV channel) original programming
English-language television shows

pl:Wieczór ze starym misiem
sv:Gammelbjörns sagor